The 15th arrondissement of Marseille is one of the 16 arrondissements of Marseille. It is governed locally together with the 16th arrondissement, with which it forms the 8th sector of Marseille.

Population

Education

 Lycée Saint-Exupéry

References

External links
 Dossier complet, INSEE

Arrondissements of Marseille